The Ministry of Culture (MOC) is the ministry of the Republic of China (Taiwan) that promotes cultural and creative industries. The ministry also maintains the National Repository of Cultural Heritage.

History
Established in 1981 by Executive Yuan, the ministry was initially called the Council for Cultural Affairs (CCA). The council was upgraded to ministerial level in May 2012 under the name Ministry of Culture.

The ministry was inaugurated on 21 May 2012, in a ceremony attended by President Ma Ying-jeou, Premier Sean Chen and several prominent artists, including poet Chou Meng-tieh, film director Li Hsing and singer Lo Ta-yu.

President Ma stated in a speech during the ceremony that if politics is a "fence", then culture is "the pair of wings that fly over the fence". He expressed hope that the MOC would spread "Chinese culture with Taiwanese characteristics" around Taiwan and the world.

In 2017, the MOC absorbed some duties of the Mongolian and Tibetan Affairs Commission, including the Mongolian and Tibetan Cultural Center.

Organizational structure

Administrative Units
 Department of General Planning
 Department of Cultural and Creative Development
 Department of Cultural Resources
 Department of Audiovisual and Music Industry
 Department of Arts Development
 Department of Humanities and Publications
 Department of Cultural Exchange

Staff Units
 Secretariat
 Department of Civil Service Ethics
 Department of Personnel Affairs
 Department of Accounting
 Information Management Department
 Legal Affairs Committee

Bureaus
 Bureau of Cultural Heritage
 Bureau of Audiovisual and Music Industry Development

Agencies or organizations
The following agencies or organizations are under the supervision of the MOC:
 National Taiwan Museum
 National Museum of History
 National Museum of Prehistory
 National Museum of Taiwan History
 National Human Rights Museum
 National Museum of Taiwan Literature
 National Taiwan Museum of Fine Arts
 National Hsinchu Living Arts Center
 National Changhua Living Art Center
 National Tainan Living Arts Center
 National Taitung Living Arts Center
 National Performing Arts Center
 National Theater and Concert Hall
 National Taichung Theater
 National Kaohsiung Center for the Arts
 National Symphony Orchestra
 National Center for Traditional Arts
 National Taiwan Symphony Orchestra
 Taiwan Film and Audiovisual Institute
 National Culture and Arts Foundation
 Sun Yat-sen Memorial Hall
 Chiang Kai-shek Memorial Hall
 National Taiwan Craft Research and Development Institute
 Huashan 1914 Creative Park
 Taichung Cultural Heritage Park
 Chiayi Cultural and Creative Industries Park
 Tainan Cultural and Creative Park
 Hualien Cultural and Creative Industries Park
 Mongolian and Tibetan Cultural Center
 Taiwan Cultural Center in Japan
 Taiwan Cultural Center in Paris
 Taipei Cultural Center in New York City

List of Ministers

Ministry of Education (Bureau of Cultural Affairs)
 Wang Hung-chun (王洪鈞) (1968 – 1975)

See also
 Executive Yuan
 Culture of Taiwan
 Medal of Culture

References

External links 

 
 

1981 establishments in Taiwan
Taiwan
Ministries established in 1981
Culture